The handball tournaments at the 2018 Mediterranean Games in Tarragona took place between 23 June and 1 July 2018.

Medal summary

Events

Medal table

Participating nations

Men

Women

References

External links
2018 Mediterranean Games – Handball

 
Sports at the 2018 Mediterranean Games
2018
Mediterranean Games
Mediterranean Games